Loretta Di Franco is an American operatic soprano. She is known for her more than 900 performances at the Metropolitan Opera from 1961-1995.

Career 
Originally a member of the Met's opera chorus, she eventually was promoted to singing small comprimario roles beginning with one of the pages in Wagner's Tannhäuser and the peasant girl in The Marriage of Figaro in 1961. She went on to win the Metropolitan Opera National Council Auditions in 1965 which led to her first substantial role, Chloe in The Queen of Spades. She continued to appear annually at the Met for the next 30 years, performing both leading and supporting roles. 

Some of the parts she performed at the Met included Annina in La traviata, both the Aunt and Barena in Janáček's Jenůfa, Barbarina and Marcellina in The Marriage of Figaro, Berta in The Barber of Seville, Countess Ceprano in Rigoletto, the Dew Fairy and the Sandman in Hansel and Gretel, Feklusa in Káťa Kabanová, the First Lady in The Magic Flute, the Flower Seller in Britten's Death in Venice, Frasquita in Carmen, Gerhilde in Die Walküre, Giannetta in L'elisir d'amore, Helen in Mourning Becomes Electra, Ines in Il trovatore, Jouvenot in Adriana Lecouvreur, Kate Pinkerton in Madama Butterfly, Laura in Luisa Miller, Lauretta in Gianni Schichi, Lisa in La sonnambula, Marianne in Der Rosenkavalier, Marthe in Faust, Musetta in La bohème, Oscar in Un ballo in maschera, Samaritana in Francesca da Rimini, Woglinde in both Das Rheingold and Götterdämmerung, Xenia in Boris Godunov, Zerlina in Don Giovanni, and title role in Lucia di Lammermoor. In 1991 she created the role of the Woman with Child in the world premiere of John Corigliano's The Ghosts of Versailles.

Videography
 Mozart: Idomeneo (1982), Deutsche Grammophon DVD, 00440-073-4234, 2006
 The Metropolitan Opera Centennial Gala, Deutsche Grammophon DVD, 00440-073-4538, 2009

References

1942 births
Living people
Winners of the Metropolitan Opera National Council Auditions
American operatic sopranos
21st-century American women